Richard William Alan Onslow, 5th Earl of Onslow  (23 August 1876 – 9 June 1945), styled Viscount Cranley until 1911, was a British peer, diplomat, parliamentary secretary and government minister.

Background and education
Viscount Cranley was the eldest son of William Onslow, 4th Earl of Onslow, and Florence Coulston Gardner. He was educated at Eton and New College, Oxford before joining the Diplomatic Service in 1901.

Diplomatic career
He became an attaché to Madrid a year later, Third Secretary to Tangier in 1903 and to St Petersburg in 1904 and Second Secretary to Berlin in 1907. In 1909, he became assistant private secretary to Sir Edward Grey, the Secretary of State for Foreign Affairs. He then held a number of positions in the Foreign Office as a clerk in 1910, private secretary to the Under-Secretary of State for Foreign Affairs from 1911 to 1913 and assistant clerk from 1913 to 1914.

Military career
Onslow joined the army on the outbreak of World War I in 1914, being commissioned as a second lieutenant on 15 June 1915. He was mentioned in despatches three times, received an OBE and the French Legion of Honour. In later years he was honorary lieutenant-colonel of the 3rd Battalion Queen's Royal Regiment (West Surrey) and honorary colonel of the 30th (Surrey) Searchlight Regiment, Royal Artillery.

Political career
Onslow had succeeded to his father's title and seat in the House of Lords in 1911. After the war, he was a Lord-in-waiting from 1919 to 1920, a Civil Lord of the Admiralty from 1920 to 1921, Parliamentary Secretary to the Ministry of Agriculture and Fisheries in 1921, Parliamentary Secretary to the Ministry of Health from 1921 to 1923, Parliamentary Secretary to the Board of Education from 1923 to 1924, Under-Secretary of State for War and vice-president of the Army Council from 1924 to 1928, and chairman of the Committees and Deputy Speaker of the House of Lords from 1931 to 1944.

Onslow was also president of the Royal Statistical Society from 1905 to 1906 and president of the Zoological Society of London from 1936 to 1942.

Writings
Onslow devoted much of his retirement to writing, producing The Empress Maud (1939); Sixty-three Years: Diplomacy, the Great War and Politics, with Notes on Travel, Sport and Other Things (1939), which went through several editions; and The Dukes of Normandy and Their Origin (1945), which was completed in the year of his death and published posthumously.

Family
Lord Onslow married Violet Marcia Catherine Warwick Bampfylde, the only daughter of Coplestone Bampfylde, 3rd Baron Poltimore, on 22 February 1906. They had two children:

 Lady Mary Florence Violet Margaret Onslow
 William Arthur Bampfylde Onslow, 6th Earl of Onslow (born 11 June 1913, died 3 June 1971)

Lord Onslow died on 9 June 1945, aged 68, and was succeeded in the peerage by his only son.

As Dowager Countess of Onslow, Violet gave the future Queen Elizabeth II a diamond and ruby butterfly brooch as a wedding gift in 1947. She died on 23 October 1954.

References

|-

1876 births
1945 deaths
Bailiffs Grand Cross of the Order of St John
British Army personnel of World War I
Conservative Party (UK) Baronesses- and Lords-in-Waiting
Deputy Lieutenants of Surrey
5
Knights Grand Cross of the Order of the British Empire
Members of the Privy Council of the United Kingdom
Presidents of the Royal Statistical Society
Presidents of the Zoological Society of London
United Kingdom Paymasters General
People educated at Eton College
Alumni of New College, Oxford
Lords of the Admiralty